The 1960 United States presidential election in Colorado took place on November 8, 1960, as part of the 1960 United States presidential election. State voters chose six representatives, or electors, to the Electoral College, who voted for president and vice president.

Colorado was won by incumbent Vice President Richard Nixon (R–California), running with United States Ambassador to the United Nations Henry Cabot Lodge, Jr., with 54.63% of the popular vote, against Senator John F. Kennedy (D–Massachusetts), running with Senator Lyndon B. Johnson, with 44.91% of the popular vote.

Results

Results by county

References

Colorado
1960
1960 Colorado elections